La Lorraine was a French automobile manufactured in Bar-le-Duc, Meuse by Charles Schmid from 1899 until 1902.  A vis-à-vis, it featured infinitely variable belt-drive.

References
David Burgess Wise, The New Illustrated Encyclopedia of Automobiles.

Lorraine, La